Thomas Harris (born 1940) is an American author.

Thomas Harris may also refer to:

Politicians
Thomas Harris (Serjeant-at-Law) (1547–1610), English politician, MP for Truro, Callington, Portsmouth and Bossiney
Thomas Harris (died 1622), MP for Maldon
Thomas Harris (died 1628) (1550–1628), MP for Shrewsbury
Thomas K. Harris (died 1816), US congressman from Tennessee
Thomas L. Harris (1816–1858), U.S. Representative from Illinois
Thomas Harris (mayor) (1817–1884), Canadian mayor of Victoria, British Columbia
Thomas R. Harris (1836–1894), political figure in Nova Scotia, Canada
Thomas Alexander Harris (1826–1895), Confederate politician & Missouri State Guard (Confederate) general
Thomas Harris (Irish politician) (1895–1974), Irish politician

Military
Thomas Alexander Harris (1826–1895), Missouri State Guard (Confederate) general and Confederate Congressman, American Civil War
Thomas James Harris (1892–1918), English recipient of the Victoria Cross
Thomas Maley Harris (1817–1906), Union Army general during the American Civil War
Thomas Noel Harris (1785–1860), British Army officer who lot an arm at the Battle of Waterloo

Sports
Thomas Harris (aviator) (died 1824), early balloonist, who was killed in an accident in 1824
Thomas Harris (rugby), English rugby union and rugby league footballer of the 1910s, and 1920s, for Cornwall (RU), Redruth R.F.C., England (RL), and Rochdale Hornets
Thomas Harris (cricketer) (1845–1918), English cricketer

Others
Thomas Harris (architect) (1829–1900/30–1900), British architect
Thomas Harris (diplomat) (1945–2021), British diplomat and banker
Thomas Harris (surgeon) (1784–1861), U.S. Navy surgeon
Thomas Harris (theatre manager) (died 1820), English theatre manager
Thomas Anthony Harris (1910–1995), American psychiatrist 
Thomas Lake Harris (1823–1906), American spiritualist
Thomas Allen Harris, founder and President of Chimpanzee Productions
Thomas Maxwell Harris (1903–1983), British botanist
Thomas Bradley Harris (1826–1866), American businessman and co-founder of the American colony of "Ellena"
Thomas Spencer Harris (1836–1893), California newspaperman
Thomas Britton Harris IV (born 1958), chief investment officer of the University of Texas Investment Management Company
Tomás Harris (1908–1964), UK Security Service officer during World War II

See also
Tom Harris (disambiguation)
Tommy Harris (disambiguation)